The 2001 National League Division Series (NLDS), the opening round of the 2001 National League playoffs, began on Tuesday, October 9, and ended on Sunday, October 14, with the champions of the three NL divisions—along with a "wild card" team—participating in two best-of-five series. The teams were:
 (1) Houston Astros (Central Division champion, 93–69) vs. (3) Atlanta Braves (Eastern Division champion, 88–74): Braves win series, 3–0.
 (2) Arizona Diamondbacks (Western Division champion, 92–70) vs. (4) St. Louis Cardinals (Wild Card, 93–69): Diamondbacks win series, 3–2.

The Diamondbacks and Braves went on to meet in the NL Championship Series (NLCS). The Diamondbacks became the National League champion, and defeated the American League champion New York Yankees in the 2001 World Series.

Matchups

Houston Astros vs. Atlanta Braves

Arizona Diamondbacks vs. St. Louis Cardinals

Houston vs. Atlanta
The Atlanta Braves won their tenth straight division title, despite having the worst record (88–74) among playoff teams. With that record, 2001 was also the Braves' worst season since 1990, when they had the worst record in baseball. The Houston Astros were in the playoffs for the seventh time, hoping to avenge two postseason losses in the 1990s to the Braves. At 93–69, and having home field advantage throughout the playoffs, the Astros were heavily favored to win this series.

Game 1
Enron Field in Houston

In Game 1, Greg Maddux of Atlanta faced Wade Miller of Houston. Brian Jordan drove in the first two runs of the game, hitting a sacrifice fly in the first with runners on first and third and a homer in the fourth. Brad Ausmus's two-run homer after a walk tied the game in the fifth for the Astros. Then Moisés Alou's groundout with runners on second and third in the sixth gave the Astros the lead, but the Braves refused to concede. In the eighth, Keith Lockhart hit a leadoff double off of Mike Jackson and scored on Marcus Giles's single to tie the game. Julio Franco reached on an error before Billy Wagner relieved Jackson and allowed a tie-breaking three-run home run to Chipper Jones. Andruw Jones's leadoff home run in the ninth off of Mike Williams made it 7–3. Vinny Castilla's leadoff home run in the bottom half gave the Astros that run back, but John Smoltz got the save as the Braves won 7–4.

Game 2
Enron Field in Houston

In Game 2, Tom Glavine and Dave Mlicki started a classic pitching duel. In the top of the second, B. J. Surhoff doubled to lead off the inning. Then Andruw Jones singled to the shortstop and an error by Julio Lugo put Surhoff on third. Rey Sánchez would then ground into a double play, but Surhoff would score to make it 1–0 Braves. In all but two innings the Astros had a hit and stranded five in the game. Glavine pitched eight innings and Smoltz recorded his second consecutive postseason save.

Game 3
Turner Field in Atlanta

In Game 3, Shane Reynolds of Houston faced John Burkett of the Braves. In the bottom of the second, Rey Sanchez doubled with two outs before Paul Bako's two-run homer put the Braves up 2–0. In the third, Julio Franco homered to make it 3–0. Then a squeeze play sacrifice bunt by Bako in the fourth with runners on first and third made it 4–0. Reynolds only lasted four innings and Burkett cruised until giving up a two-run homer to Daryle Ward in the sixth. Chipper Jones's two-run homer provided insurance in the bottom of the eighth of off Octavio Dotel and Smoltz once again dominated the ninth. Ausmus flied to center to end the series. Once again, the Astros had been denied by the Braves for their first ever postseason series win. This was the last postseason series win by the Braves until 2020, when they swept the Cincinnati Reds in the newly-added Wild Card Series.

Composite box
2001 NLDS (3–0): Atlanta Braves over Houston Astros

Arizona vs. St. Louis
The St. Louis Cardinals were making their second straight postseason appearance and they hoped to avenge their NLCS loss against the New York Mets in 2000. The Arizona Diamondbacks were making their second playoff appearance and they too were stunned by the Mets in 1999, having won 100 games that year. This was the first NLDS to go to 5 games.

Game 1
Bank One Ballpark in Phoenix, Arizona

Game 1 was a game of excellent starting pitching. Matt Morris faced Curt Schilling, who made the most of his first playoff start in eight years. Both pitchers were on even terms until Arizona scored the game's only run in the bottom of the fifth when Steve Finley singled home Damian Miller, who was hit by a pitch leading off the inning and moved to second on a sacrifice bunt. Schilling pitched a complete-game three-hit shutout as Arizona won 1–0 to take a 1–0 series lead.

Game 2
Bank One Ballpark in Phoenix, Arizona

In Game 2, Woody Williams of St. Louis faced Randy Johnson of Arizona. Johnson seemingly had the Cardinals in the first when he got Plácido Polanco to ground into a double play. But Édgar Rentería walked and the soon-to-be-named NL Rookie of the Year Albert Pujols hit his first playoff home run to make it 2–0. Williams hit a leadoff doubled in the third, moved to third on a sacrifice bunt, and scored on Polanco's sac fly that made it 3–0 Cardinals. The D'Backs scored a run in the eighth on Danny Bautista's groundout off of Steve Kline with runners on second and third (the run charged to Williams), but an errant throw to first by pitcher Miguel Batista in the ninth on Kerry Robinson's ground ball with runners on second and third gave the Cardinals that run back. Steve Kline got the save in the bottom of the ninth to even the series.

Game 3
Busch Stadium (II) in St. Louis, Missouri

In Game 3, Batista returned to the mound to start for Arizona. Opposing him would be Darryl Kile. Both pitchers kept the game scoreless until Jim Edmonds's two-run homer in the bottom of the fourth gave the Cardinals a 2–0 lead. Luis Gonzalez responded with a homer off the right field pole to make it a one-run game in the sixth. Then the Diamondbacks came back in dramatic fashion. After Kile allowed a leadoff walk in the top of the seventh, Mike Matthews came on in relief and allowed a one-out single before Greg Colbrunn tied the game with an RBI single. A fielder's choice put two men on for eventual NLCS MVP Craig Counsell. He then hit a three-run home run to right that put the D'Backs up 5–2. Rentería's home run in the bottom of the inning off of Brian Anderson made it 5–3, but Byung-hyun Kim closed the door in the ninth despite allowing a leadoff single and subsequent walk. Tragically, this wound up being Kile's final playoff game.

Game 4
Busch Stadium (II) in St. Louis, Missouri

Albie Lopez looked to close the door on the Cards. Opposing him would be Bud Smith. Smith got into trouble in the top of the first when he allowed two walks and Steve Finley singled home a run to make it 1–0 Diamondbacks. However, Fernando Viña hit a leadoff single, stole second, moved to third on a groundout and scored on J. D. Drew's single to tie the game in the bottom half of the inning. Then Jim Edmonds's home run in the bottom of the second put the Cardinals up for good. Fernando Viña's two-run homer after a walk in the third gave the Cardinals insurance. Both bullpens held the other team to nothing for the rest of the game as the series was once again tied.

Game 5
Bank One Ballpark in Phoenix, Arizona

In the clinching Game 5, Matt Morris once again faced Curt Schilling. Both pitchers were on their game, allowing only one run throughout the entire game. Morris was the first to falter in the bottom of the fourth when he gave up a solo home run to Reggie Sanders. Schilling was masterful and was four outs away from winning the series. He was working on a four-hit shutout when J. D. Drew tied the game with a home run in the eighth. Schilling pitched a complete game and in the ninth, a leadoff double by Matt Williams off of Dave Veres put the winning run on base. A sacrifice bunt by Damian Miller put pinch runner Midre Cummings on third. Steve Kline relieved Veres and after Greg Colbrunn was walked intentionally, Cummings tried to steal home on the squeeze play attempt and got caught. Colbrunn went to second and Danny Bautista came on to pinch run. Then Tony Womack delivered the series winning single to left field. The Diamondbacks won their first postseason series ever and were now going to their first ever NLCS.

Composite box
2001 NLDS (3–2): Arizona Diamondbacks over St. Louis Cardinals

Media coverage
For the first and only time, Fox Family and Fox carried the National League Division Series, with Kenny Albert and Rod Allen calling the action of Game 1 and Game 2 of the Atlanta–Houston series for Fox Family, while Mel Proctor and Rod Allen called the action of Game 3 of the Atlanta–Houston series for Fox.  Fox Family and Fox carried the National League Division Series, with Thom Brennaman (himself a Diamondbacks broadcaster) and Steve Lyons calling the action of Game 1 and Game 2 of the Arizona–St. Louis series for Fox Family, while Joe Buck and Tim McCarver called the action of Game 3, Game 4 and Game 5 of the Arizona–St. Louis series for Fox Family (Games 3–4), and Fox (Game 5).  ESPN Radio provided national radio coverage for the fourth consecutive year, with Wayne Hagin and Buck Showalter calling the action of the Atlanta–Houston series, while Charley Steiner and Dave Campbell called the action of the Arizona–St. Louis series.

Locally, the Arizona–St. Louis portion of the 2001 NLDS was called on KTAR-AM in Phoenix by Greg Schulte, Jeff Munn, Rod Allen (Games 4–5) and Jim Traber, and on KMOX-AM in St. Louis by Jack Buck (Games 3–4), Mike Shannon and Dan McLaughlin (Games 1–2, 5), while the Atlanta–Houston portion of the 2001 NLDS was called on WSB-AM in Atlanta by Pete Van Wieren, Skip Caray, Don Sutton and Joe Simpson, and on KTRH-AM in Houston by Milo Hamilton and Alan Ashby.

Notes

External links
 ATL vs. HOU at Baseball-Reference
 ARI vs. STL at Baseball-Reference

National League Division Series
National League Division Series
Arizona Diamondbacks postseason
Atlanta Braves postseason
St. Louis Cardinals postseason
Houston Astros postseason
2001 in sports in Arizona
2001 in sports in Georgia (U.S. state)
2001 in sports in Missouri
2001 in sports in Texas
2001 in Atlanta
2001 in Houston
2000s in Phoenix, Arizona
2000s in St. Louis
October 2001 sports events in the United States